This is the discography of Canadian Christian rapper and rock artist, Manafest.  He has released eleven studio albums, three EPs, one live album, fifty five single and has made thirty eighth music videos.

Albums

Studio albums

Live albums

Remix albums

EPs

Compilation inclusions 

 Hip Hope Hits 2006, "Let It Go" and "What I Got to Say" (Gotee, 2005)
 Launch: Ignition, "Let It Go" (CMC, 2005)
 Hip Hope Hits 2007, "Rodeo" (Gotee, 2006)
 Launch: Starting Line, "Style" (CMC, 2006)
 27th Annual Covenant Hits, "Let It Go" (CMC, 2006)
 Hip Hope Hits 2008, "Bounce" (Gotee, 2007)
 Launch: Inferno, "Out of Time" (CMC, 2007) (bonus online download)
 Canada Rocks, "Impossible" (CMC, 2008)
 GMA Canada presents 30th Anniversary Collection, "Bounce" (CMC, 2008)
 Canadian Hit, "No Plan B" (CMC, 2010)
 Christmastime All Year, "California Christmas" (BEC, 2013)

Singles 

 "Do It Afraid" (2020)

Music videos

Lyric videos

References

Discographies of Canadian artists
Christian music discographies